Vasio is a Celtic god, of whom little is known. He was the god presiding over the town of Vasio (now Vaison-la-Romaine), east of the lower Rhone valley.

References 

Dictionary of Celtic Myth and Legend. Miranda Green. Thames and Hudson Ltd. London. 1997
Gaulish gods